This list of the prehistoric life of Arkansas contains the various prehistoric life-forms whose fossilized remains have been reported from within the US state of Arkansas.

Precambrian
The Paleobiology Database records no known occurrences of Precambrian fossils in Alabama.

Paleozoic

Selected Paleozoic taxa of Arkansas

 †Adnatoceras
 †Amphiscapha
 †Amplexus
 †Ananaspis
 †Anthracoceras
 †Aphelaeceras
 †Arcanoceras
 †Archaeocidaris
 Archaeolithophyllum – tentative report
  †Archimedes
 †Archimylacris
 †Arkanites
 †Athyris
 †Atrypa
  †Aviculopecten
 †Aviculopecten inspeciosus
 †Aviculopecten jennyi
 †Aviculopecten morrowensis
 †Aviculopecten squamula
 † Avonia
 †Axinolobus
 †Bactritimimus
 †Baschkirites
 †Bellerophon
 †Bellerophon welshi
 †Bisatoceras
 †Bistrialites
 †Branneroceras
 †Cancelloceras
 †Cavusgnathus
 †Cheirurus
 †Chonetes
 †Cleiothyridina
 †Composita
 †Cornuproetus
 †Cravenoceras
 †Cypricardinia – tentative report
  †Dalmanites – type locality for genus
 †Deiphon
 †Delops
 †Diacalymene
 †Dicoelosia
 †Dolorthoceras
 †Echinaria
 †Edmondia
 †Encrinurus
 †Endolobus
 †Eophacops
 †Eospirifer
 †Eowellerites
  †Eucalyptocrinites
 †Euomphalus
 †Gastrioceras
 Gastrochaenolites
 †Girvanella
 †Glyptambon – type locality for genus
 †Glyptopleura
 †Gnathodus
  †Goniatites
 †Goniatites crenistria – or unidentified related form
 †Hematites
 †Irvingella
 †Kazakhstania – tentative report
 †Lingula
 †Liroceras – tentative report
 †Mariceras
 †Meristina
  †Metacoceras
 †Michelinoceras
 †Naticopsis
 †Ozarcus – type locality for genus
 †Ozarcus mapesae – type locality for species
 †Pachylyroceras
 †Paladin
 †Paleoconus
 †Paralegoceras
  †Pentremites
 †Peripetoceras
 †Platyceras
 †Plectodonta – tentative report
 †Plicochonetes
 †Posidonia
 †Proetus
 †Quinnites
 †Rayonnoceras
 †Sandia
 †Solenochilus
 †Solenomorpha
  †Sphaerexochus
 †Spirifer
 †Stearoceras
 †Stigmaria
 †Stroboceras
 †Sutherlandia
 †Tesuquea
 †Triboloceras – tentative report
 †Tripteroceroides – tentative report
 Trypanites
 †Tylonautilus
 †Valhallites
 †Wilkingia
 †Zia

Mesozoic

Selected Mesozoic taxa of Arkansas

 †Anomia
 †Baculites
 †Baculites crickmayi
 †Baculites ovatus
 Botula
 †Botula conchafodentis
  †Brontopodus
 Cadulus
 Caestocorbula
 †Caestocorbula crassaplica
 †Caestocorbula crassiplica
  Caryophyllia
 †Cirroceras
 Cliona
 Corbicula
 †Crenella
 †Crenella serica
  Cucullaea
 †Cucullaea capax
 Cylichna
 †Cymella
 †Dentalium
 †Dentalium leve
 †Desmophyllites
 †Didymoceras
 †Didymoceras binodosum
 †Didymoceras platycostatum
  †Discoscaphites
 †Discoscaphites conradi
 †Douvilleiceras
 †Echinocorys
 †Eutrephoceras
  †Exogyra
 †Exogyra costata
 †Exogyra ponderosa
 †Gaudryceras
 †Heminautilus
 †Hoploscaphites
 †Inoceramus
 †Jeletzkytes
 †Jeletzkytes nodosus
 Limatula
 †Linthia
 †Mathilda
 †Menuites
 †Micraster
 Micropora – tentative report
 †Naomichelys
  †Nostoceras
 †Nostoceras approximans
 †Pachydiscus
 Panopea
 †Placenticeras
  †Platecarpus
 †Protocardia
 †Pteria
 †Pterotrigonia
 †Pterotrigonia thoracica
 Pycnodonte
 †Pycnodonte vesicularis
 Serpula
 †Sphenodiscus
 Spondylus
 †Stylina
 †Tenea
 †Thamnasteria
  †Toxochelys – type locality for genus
 †Toxochelys latiremis – type locality for species
 Trachycardium
 Turritella
 †Turritella bilira
 †Turritella trilira
 †Uhligella – tentative report

Cenozoic

Selected Cenozoic taxa of Arkansas

 Acteon
 Agaronia
 Antalis
  Architectonica
 Arius – or unidentified comparable form
 Astrangia
 Athleta
 Barbatia
  †Basilosaurus
 †Basilosaurus cetoides
 Blarina
 †Blarina brevicauda
 †Bootherium
  †Bootherium bombifrons
 Brachidontes
 †Brachyprotoma
 †Brachyprotoma obtusata
 Bullia
 Caestocorbula
 Canis
  †Canis armbrusteri
 †Canis latrans
 Carcharhinus
 Carcharias
 Castor
 †Castor canadensis
 Cervus
 Chlamys
 Clavilithes
 Coluber
  †Coluber constrictor – or unidentified comparable form
 Conomitra
 Conus
 Corbula
 Crassostrea
  Crotalus
 Cytherea – report made of unidentified related form or using admittedly obsolete nomenclature
 Dasyatis
 Dentalium
 †Diaphyodus
 Epitonium
 Eptesicus
 †Eptesicus fuscus
 Equus
  †Equus scotti – tentative report
 Erethizon
 †Erethizon dorsatum
  Galeocerdo
 Galeodea
 Galeorhinus
 Geomys
 †Geomys bursarius
 Ginglymostoma
 Hemipristis
 †Hemipristis curvatus
 Hemisinus
 Hexaplex
  †Iridomyrmex
 †Iridomyrmex mapesi – type locality for species
 †Lacunaria
 Latirus
  Lepisosteus
 Lepus
 †Lepus alleni
 †Lepus americanus – tentative report
 †Linthia
 Lynx
 †Lynx rufus
 †Mammuthus
  †Mammuthus columbi
 Marmota
 †Marmota monax
 Mephitis
 †Mephitis mephitis
 Mesalia
 Microtus
  †Miracinonyx
 †Miracinonyx studeri
 Mustela
 †Mustela richardsonii
 Myliobatis
  †Mylohyus
 †Mylohyus fossilis
 Myotis
 Mytilus
 Nassarius
Neogale
†Neogale frenata
 †Neogale vison
 Neotoma
 Nucula
 Odocoileus
 †Odocoileus virginianus
 Ondatra
 Ostrea
 †Pachecoa
 Panthera
  †Panthera onca
 Pekania
 Peromyscus
 Pitar
 Pituophis
 Pitymys
 Pleuromeris
 Polinices
  Pristis
 Procyon
 †Procyon lotor
 Propeamussium
 †Protocardia – report made of unidentified related form or using admittedly obsolete nomenclature
 Pseudoliva
  Reithrodontomys
 Retusa
 Scalopus
 †Scalopus aquaticus
 †Sinistrella
  †Smilodon
 †Smilodon fatalis
 Sorex
 †Sorex cinereus
 †Sorex fumeus
 †Sorex minutus
 †Sorex monticolus
 Spermophilus
 †Spermophilus tridecemlineatus – tentative report
  Sphyraena
 Spilogale
 †Spilogale putorius – tentative report
  Spisula
 Sylvilagus
 †Sylvilagus floridanus – tentative report
 Tamiasciurus
 †Tamiasciurus hudsonicus
 Terebra
 Teredo
 Trichiurus
 Turritella
 Urocyon
  †Urocyon cinereoargenteus
 Ursus
 †Ursus americanus
 Venericardia
 Vulpes
 Yoldia

References
 

Arkansas